Levieux is a French surname, meaning Elder; and its equivalent surname in English is Elder (surname).

Surname
 Reynaud Levieux (1613-1699), French painter from Nîmes.
 Albert-Édouard Levieux de Caligny, French diplomat to China, present at Taiping Rebellion.
 Nicolas LeVieux de La Motte d’Esgry (1486-1650, Paris), since 1611 Secretary of Finances to Louis XIII, King of France.
 Nicolas Levieux de Hauteville (1617-1678), lieutenant-general for civil and criminal affairs in the seneschal's court at Quebec,  in New France, from 1651 to 1656, Canada. 
 Cédric Levieux, since November 2018, France Alternates member at the PPI Board a not-for-profit international non-governmental organisation with its headquarters in Brussels, Belgium.

Alternative spellings or older variations of the surname
 Lavieux
 Levieu
 Lavieu
 Levieil
 Levieille
 Lavie
 Levie
 Levye
 Levy
 Levi
 Delevieux
 Levyeux
 Le Vieux
 de la Vieu

References

Surnames